The 1982 NCAA Division III football season, part of college football in the United States organized by the National Collegiate Athletic Association at the Division III level, began in August 1982, and concluded with the NCAA Division III Football Championship, also known as the Stagg Bowl, in December 1982 at Garrett-Harrison Stadium in Phenix City, Alabama.

The West Georgia Wolves won their first Division III championship, defeating the Augustana (IL) Vikings by a final score of 14−0.

Conference changes and new programs

New conference
 The Minnesota Intercollegiate Athletic Conference, and its nine members all from Minnesota, became an NCAA Division III conference this season, transitioning from Division II of the NAIA after the end of the 1981 season.

Conference changes

Conference standings

Conference champions

Postseason
The 1982 NCAA Division III Football Championship playoffs were the tenth annual single-elimination tournament to determine the national champion of men's NCAA Division III college football. The championship Stagg Bowl game was held at Garrett-Harrison Stadium in Phenix City, Alabama for the tenth consecutive year. Like the previous seven championships, eight teams competed in this edition.

Playoff bracket

See also
1982 NCAA Division I-A football season
1982 NCAA Division I-AA football season
1982 NCAA Division II football season

References